The Tornado outbreak of September 21–23, 2006 was a significant tornado outbreak that occurred across a large swath of the Central United States from September 21 – September 23, 2006. 48 tornadoes were confirmed.

Overview

Some of the September 22 storms caused heavy damage in some locales with injuries. The strongest tornado hit Crosstown, Missouri – it was an F4 tornado, the first since March 12.  Several well constructed structures in Crosstown were completely leveled, and hundreds of others were severely damaged. Areas just outside Pilot Knob, a small town in Missouri, were affected by two separate F2 tornadoes that caused considerable damage. The northern fringe of Metropolis in Illinois was also hit by a damaging F3 tornado in which homes were completely destroyed. In eastern and central Missouri alone, over 400 homes or other structures were badly damaged or destroyed. 10 people were injured. Several tornadoes also occurred north of Birmingham, Alabama – three of which were rated as F2's.  In addition to the tornadoes, there were numerous reports of straight-line wind damage and hail larger than baseballs, as well as countless reports of damage from flash flooding due to the heavy rains as a result of the thunderstorms.

This was one of the most widespread non-tropical September outbreaks in United States history, yet no tornado-related deaths occurred (although 12 people were killed by other thunderstorm impacts).

Confirmed tornadoes

September 21 event

September 22 event

September 23 event

Non-tornadic events
In addition to the tornadoes, severe flooding has been reported in the region. Kentucky was hardest hit by the flooding due to continuous thunderstorms in many areas. Eight people died as a result of the flooding, including a father and his 1-year-old daughter, generally because of people driving cars or walking into floodwaters. In Arkansas, a woman died when a lightning bolt struck her boat and two other people were missing. Another fatality occurred in the state. Finally, in Illinois, an apparent lightning bolt spark a house fire that killed two women. Significant flooding was also reported in southern Indiana, northern Arkansas, southern Missouri, southern Illinois and West Tennessee.

The Louisville area was hard hit, with extensive damage in numerous neighborhoods. Some communities were only accessible by boat. Two of the local pumping stations were also flooded.

Sections of Interstate 64 and 65 in Kentucky were also closed due to the flooding.

See also
List of North American tornadoes and tornado outbreaks
Tornadoes of 2006

References

External links
 Storm Prediction Center – preliminary storm reports log.

F4 tornadoes by date
Tornadoes of 2006
Tornadoes in Alabama
Tornadoes in Arkansas
Tornadoes in Illinois
Tornadoes in Kansas
Tornadoes in Kentucky
Tornadoes in Michigan
Tornadoes in Missouri
Tornadoes in Oklahoma
Tornadoes in Tennessee
Tornado outbreak
Tornado outbreak